Doug Maitland (1922-2006) was a Grey Cup champion Canadian Football League player. He played halfback.

A native of suburban Montreal, Maitland began his pro career in 1945 with the Montreal Hornets and played with the inaugural Montreal Alouettes team in 1946. He was part of the Larks first Grey Cup championship. He played 38 games for the Als over 4 seasons.

References

1922 births
2006 deaths
Sportspeople from Laval, Quebec
Montreal Alouettes players
Players of Canadian football from Quebec